Costantino Sereno (Casale Monferrato, Province of Alessandria, 1829 - Turin, 1893) was an Italian painter.

He was born in Casal Monferrato in the Piedmont. He studied at the Albertina Academy until the early 1840s. His early career predominantly encompassed historical paintings. He exhibited in 1881 at Milan, a genre paintings, depicting: Il Chilo. In Rome, in 1884: Monacanda prima di pronunciare i voti. In 1884, in Turin: Monacanda, un'ora prima di prendere gli abiti monacali. Inoltre: Scoperta di un bersagliere; Un bacio di furtiva provenienza.

He also presented a project of a painting for the municipal theater of Casal Monferrato, and the ceiling of the Teatro Scribe and the curtain of Teatro Alfieri in Turin.

Among other fresco works are those for the Palazzo Carignano in Turin; the Duomo of Casale Monferrato (1860-1861); the Sanctuary della Consolata, Church of San Secondo, and of Santa Maria Ausiliatrice in Turin; Angels and the Assumption of the Virgin (1865) for the parish church of Fubine in Alessandria. He also designed mosaics and stained glass windows for churches. He exhibited at the Turin Promotrice from 1844 to 1888, to tepid public reception, but abundant royal patronage.

References

1829 births
1893 deaths
19th-century Italian painters
Italian male painters
Painters from Piedmont
Accademia Albertina alumni
19th-century Italian male artists